Yes, Yes, Love in Tyrol is a 1955 West German musical comedy film directed by Géza von Bolváry and starring Gerhard Riedmann, Hans Moser, and Doris Kirchner. It is a loose reworking of the plot of the play Kohlhiesel's Daughters by Hanns Kräly.

It was shot at the Tempelhof Studios in West Berlin and on location in Tyrol. The film's sets were designed by the art director Hans Kuhnert.

Cast

References

Bibliography

External links

1955 comedy films
German comedy films
West German films
Films directed by Géza von Bolváry
Films set in Austria
Films set in the Alps
Constantin Film films
Films shot at Tempelhof Studios
1950s German films